Fred Hampton "Ted" Lovegrove, Jr. (May 17, 1939 – April 12, 2013) was an American politician.

Born in New York City, Lovegrove served in the United States Army. Lovegrove graduated from Chestnut Hill Academy and went to Villanova University. He served in the Connecticut State Senate from Fairfield, Connecticut.

Notes

1939 births
2013 deaths
Politicians from New York City
People from Fairfield, Connecticut
Villanova University alumni
Connecticut state senators
Chestnut Hill Academy alumni